Here Come the Noise Makers was the first live album by American singer and pianist Bruce Hornsby. It is a double album comprising songs recorded between 1998 and New Year's Eve 1999/2000. It was Hornsby's first album with his touring act the Noisemakers.

The album not only captures the ambience of one of Hornsby’s concerts, but also reflects the vibrant temperament and true stylistic diversity with which he approaches his craft, treating the live performance like a journey in search of the perfect musical moment.

With this album, Hornsby is determined to create a hybrid style that encompasses rock, jazz, and classical music within a jam band mentality. The concert musical experience captured on the album embodied the gestures towards complete improvisatory musical spontaneity and towards recasting old songs as unrecognizably new that so much of Hornsby's solo work had been forecasting, this time in a full band setting. The album covers pieces by many of Hornsby's musical influences, George Gershwin, Samuel Barber, Bill Evans, Bud Powell and Bob Dylan among them. Hornsby directly acknowledges the influence of the Grateful Dead by performing their songs "Lady with a Fan" and "Black Muddy River" and by including a version of "The Valley Road" that seems to have "emerged from the Grateful Dead's "Wharf Rat."

Track listing
All songs by Bruce Hornsby, except where noted.

Disc 1
"Piano Intro"/"Great Divide" - 7:47
"Long Tall Cool One" - 7:54
"The Red Plains" (Bruce Hornsby, John Hornsby) - 5:58
"The Road Not Taken" - 7:22
"Lady with a Fan" (Garcia, Hunter) - 5:24
"Stander on the Mountain" - 7:51
"Jacob's Ladder"/"Blackberry Blossom" (Bruce Hornsby, John Hornsby/Traditional) - 4:31
Piano Intro/"I Loves You Porgy"/"Nocturne" (Gershwin, Gershwin, Heyward/Barber) - 4:22
"The Way It Is" - 7:01
"Twelve Tone Tune"/"King of the Hill" (Evans/Hornsby) - 11:44

Disc 2
"Spider Fingers"/"Tempus Fugit" (Powell) - 10:25
"Sneaking Up on Boo Radley" - 5:38
"Fortunate Son" - 4:47
"The Valley Road" (Bruce Hornsby, John Hornsby) - 7:13
"The End Of The Innocence" (Don Henley, Bruce Hornsby) - 8:41
"Sunflower Cat"/"It Takes a Lot to Laugh, It Takes a Train to Cry" (Garcia, Hunter, Mangini/Bob Dylan) - 9:23
"Rainbow's Cadillac" - 7:23
"Mandolin Rain"/"Black Muddy River" (Bruce Hornsby, John Hornsby/Garcia, Hunter) - 12:30

Personnel

The Noisemakers 
 Bruce Hornsby – lead vocals, acoustic piano, accordion
 John "J. T." Thomas – keyboards, organ, backing vocals
 Doug Derryberry – guitars, mandolin, backing vocals
 J. V. Collier – bass
 Michael Baker – drums, backing vocals
 Bobby Read – bass clarinet, saxophone, backing vocals

Additional musicians 
 John D'earth – trumpet ("Spider Fingers", "Long Tall Cool One", "Sneaking Up on Boo Radley")
 Debbie Henry – vocals ("Great Divide")
 Steve Kimock – guitar ("The End of the Innocence")
 Bonny Bonaparte – drums ("The End of the Innocence")
 Land Richards – drums ("Road Not Taken", "Stander on the Mountain", "The Valley Road", "Sunflower Cat", "Jacob's Ladder")

Production 
 Produced and Mixed by Bruce Hornsby and Wayne Pooley 
 Associate Producer – Bobby  Hornsby
 A&R – David Bendeth
 Mastered by Ted Jensen at Sterling Sound (New York, NY).
 Art Direction and Design – Henry Marquez and X-Out.
 Cover Photography – David Halliburton 
 All Other Photography – Carey Wilhelm
 Liner Notes – Bruce Hornsby 
 Management – Andy Martin and Deep South Entertainment.
 Road Crew – Gary Crosniak, Caldwell Gray, Gary Grimm, Alan Miller and Georg Slejko.

References

Bruce Hornsby albums
2000 live albums
RCA Records live albums